Payan Rafat (born September 9, 1970 in Astara, Iran) is a retired Iranian footballer and current coach. He served his golden days in Persepolis. His style of play was similar to Iranian football legend Ali Daei. He is considered one of the most memorable players in history of Tehran derby, the rivalry between Persepolis and Esteghlal; as he received a punch from rival goalkeeper Parviz Boroumand in the famous derby played in 2000.

Club career 
After playing 6 seasons in Malavan, he joined Persepolis. He later left for a half season at the UAE League's Hatta Club; and returned to Persepolis in 2002.

Club Career Statistics

References

External links
Video of Boroumand–Rafat Conflict in Tehran Derby

People from Astara, Iran
1970 births
Living people
Iranian footballers
Persepolis F.C. players
Malavan players
Saba players
Homa F.C. players
Association football forwards
Sportspeople from Gilan province